Mo Alexander (born November 7, 1970) is an American stand-up comedian and actor. Alexander was born and raised in Memphis, Tennessee. He began his full-time professional comedy career in July 1996 and was headlining on stages throughout the US within three years. His comic influences include Bill Hicks, Paul Mooney, and Richard Pryor. He has worked with comedians such as  Keenen Ivory Wayans, and Kevin Hart.

Career 
In 1999, Alexander impressed Keenen Ivory Wayans with a good natured roast after a show and was asked to be the opening act on tour with Wayans. Alexander's comedy history includes his own Las Vegas show, “The Mo Funny Show” at the Casino Royale. In 1999 he appeared on ABC’s Politically Incorrect with Bill Maher. In 1998 he appeared in (former Poison frontman) Bret Michaels' film “A Letter from Death Row”. In 2017 he made his first national stand-up appearance for Comedy Central, appearing in the Kevin Hart Presents series “Hart of the City: Memphis Edition” which first aired December 15, 2017. He has also been on several syndicated radio shows in major markets including The Bob & Tom Show (Indianapolis) and Mancow's Morning Madhouse (Chicago).

He has been a semifinalist in both the San Francisco Comedy Competition (2012) and the Seattle Comedy Competition (2013).

Alexander has headlined at several comedy festivals such as Asheville Comedy Fest (2015), Altercation Festival (2016), Hopkins Comedy Festival (2017), Memphis Comedy Festival (2017)and North Carolina Comedy Festival (2018). Alexander has released five CD’s:  “Mo Files” (2000), “Evolution” (2006), “Nappy Headed Hoes and Other FCC Infractions” (2008), “Just in Case the Mayans are Right” (2012), which was featured on the iTunes new and notable charts front page for five months, and “Got Clots” (2016). “Got Clots” was released April 5, 2016, the one year anniversary of the day he died for two minutes from an embolism.

Early life 

Mo Alexander was born in Memphis, Tennessee and raised in the Soulsville neighborhood just down the street from the original Stax Records. His mother was Jerri Edwards, a third grade school teacher. She died on November 8, 2005. His father was Charles Alexander. He was predominantly raised by his grandmother, Jean Williamson.

Mo Alexander went to the predominantly black private catholic school, Father Bertrand Elementary, where he balanced being a computer nerd and playing basketball while trying to find his place. This is where he found that humor would get him out of bad situations.
His high school years were spent at Memphis Catholic High School hanging out with the nerdier set of kids who also had his twisted version of humor. This is where he found Monty Python and British comedian Lenny Henry and his first theatrical work in the play "Arsenic and Old Lace". In his senior year he was at school from 6am until 8pm nightly because of sports. He was a wrestler, a cheerleader, and the school mascot. Unlike most mascots, Mo was not silent. He was never afraid to take a mic and make the crowds rowdy.
After Graduating he moved on to the university of Memphis where he majored in Physics and minored in Theatre. He quit there in 1994 when he decided he wanted to do comedy full-time and didn’t want to have a degree to fall back on. He believed “if I have something to fall back on I won’t try hard enough in comedy.”

Discography/Videography

Filmography 
 Get Serious (1995)
 A Letter from Death Row (1998)
 Sicc in the Head (2014)

Television 
 Politically Incorrect with Bill Maher(1999)
 Who's Laughing Now? (2013)
 Kevin Hart Presents Hart of the City: Memphis (2017)

References

External links 
 Slap the Stupid http://www.slapthestupid.com
 Mo Alexander http://www.moalexander.net
 Mo Alexander's YouTube https://www.youtube.com/moalexander
 CDBaby https://store.cdbaby.com/artist/moalexander
 iTunes  https://itunes.apple.com/us/artist/mo-alexander/199831381

1970 births
Comedians from Tennessee
Male actors from Memphis, Tennessee
Living people
21st-century American comedians